The coat of arms of Belize was adopted upon independence, and the current coat of arms is only slightly different from that used when Belize was a British colony (the Union Jack has been removed, and a Mestizo woodcutter has replaced one of the supporting Afro-Belizean woodcutters).

The circular border of the coat is formed by 25 leaves. Within the circle is a mahogany tree, in front of which is a shield tierced per pall inverted.  Within the shield are the tools of a woodcutter in the upper sections and a ship in the lower one.  These are symbolic of the importance of mahogany in the 18th- and 19th-century Belizean economy.

The flag of Belize features the coat of arms in its centre.

Official description
The British College of Heraldry laid forth the blazon of the coat of arms as follows:

Crest – A mahogany tree proper

Compartment – A grassy field proper

Escutcheon – Party per pall inverted, 1st Argent a paddle and a squaring axe proper in saltire 2nd Or a saw and beating axe proper in saltire 3rd per fess bleu celeste and barry wavy or vert azure above the last a sailing ship proper

Supporters – Dexter a Mestizo (revised post-independence to Belizean Mestizo) woodsman proper garbed in trousers argent bearing in the dexter hand a beating axe, sinister an African (revised post-independence to Afro Belizean) woodsman proper garbed in trousers argent bearing in the sinister hand a paddle proper.

Other elements – The whole surrounded by a wreath of 25 leaves proper

Historical versions

References

National symbols of Belize
Belize
Belize
Belize
Belize